Bradley Mauer (born 13 October 1999) is a South African cricketer. He made his List A debut for Border in the 2017–18 CSA Provincial One-Day Challenge on 25 March 2018. He made his first-class debut for Border in the 2018–19 CSA 3-Day Provincial Cup on 31 January 2019.

References

External links
 

1999 births
Living people
South African cricketers
Border cricketers
Place of birth missing (living people)